Lavender Creek is a stream in the U.S. state of Georgia. It is a tributary to Armuchee Creek.

Lavender Creek was named after George Michael Lavender, a local merchant.

References

Rivers of Georgia (U.S. state)
Rivers of Floyd County, Georgia